The Severn River , a perennial river that forms part of the Border Rivers group, is part of the Macintyre catchment of the Murray–Darling basin, located in the Northern Tablelands and North West Slopes regions of New South Wales, Australia.

Course and features
The river rises on the western slopes of the Great Dividing Range, north of Glen Innes and flows generally northwest, joined by eleven tributaries, including Beardy Waters, and impounded by Lake Pindari, near Ashford. The river reaches its confluence with the Macintyre River, north of Wallangra; descending  over its  course.

Recreation

The Severn River flows through Kwaimbal National Park.

Excellent fishing can be found along the river and is regularly stocked with native fingerlings, Murray Cod and Golden Perch.

This bridge consists of a series of timber trusses completed in 1886 and is long, with fifteen spans totalling . When completed it was the longest timber truss bridge in Australia.

See also

 Rivers of New South Wales
 Severn River (Queensland)

References

External links
 

Rivers of New South Wales
New England (New South Wales)
Murray-Darling basin